Marijane Louise Landis ( Frey; August 3, 1928 – December 22, 2015) was an American television broadcaster, producer, host, television personality, and children's television series creator, known for her work with WGAL-TV in Lancaster, Pennsylvania. Considered a pioneer in Pennsylvania television broadcasting, Landis created and produced two children's series: Percy Platypus and His Friends, which aired from 1955 until 1974, and Sunshine Corners from 1974 to 1979.

Landis, who joined the staff of WGAL in October 1952, was originally hired from her previous job at a small theater to host programming focused on women. She was one of the station's first on-air personalities, as well as one of the first women to work in television in Pennsylvania.

In 1978, Landis transitioned from on-air to behind-the-scenes when she became the community services manager and personnel director at WGAL. She produced and oversaw much of the station's public service announcements and community outreach efforts during the 1980s and early 1990s. Landis retired in 1993 after 41 years with WGAL. Landis and Freed's puppets were donated to the State Museum of Pennsylvania in the 1990s.

The puppets which Landis and puppeteer Jim Freed used in Percy Platypus and His Friends were donated to the collection of the State Museum of Pennsylvania during the 1990s. 

In 1998, Landis was inducted into the Pennsylvania Association of Broadcasters Hall of Fame. Among the honors she collected during her lifetime were a national U.S. Air Force American Spirit Award in 1984 and the Muscular Dystrophy Association Award for Sunshine Corners.

Personal info
Landis was born Marijane Louise Frey on August 3, 1928, in Lancaster, Pennsylvania. 

The daughter of Earle W. Frey and Miriam K. (Sauer) Grey, Landis' husband, Harry L. Landis, died in 1986. The couple's twin sons died shortly after birth in December 1950. She was survived by her daughter, Louise Cynthia "Cindy" Bonham; son-in-law, John; and a grandson, Michael. 
A resident of Millersville, Pennsylvania, Landis died on December 22, 2015, from undisclosed causes, aged  87.

References

1928 births
2015 deaths
20th-century American women
American television hosts
American women television producers
Television producers from Pennsylvania
People from Millersville, Pennsylvania
American women television presenters